5-Ethoxy-DMT (5-ethoxy-N,N-dimethyltryptamine, 5-EtO-DMT, O-ethylbufotenine) is a tryptamine derivative which has been previously synthesized as a chemical intermediate, but has not been studied to determine its pharmacology.

The widespread recreational use of N,N-dialkylated 5-methoxytryptamine derivatives including 5-MeO-DMT, 5-MeO-MiPT and 5-MeO-DiPT has led to concern that the 5-ethoxy homologs of these drugs could emerge as novel designer drugs, and consequently 5-EtO-DMT and other derivatives including 5-EtO-DET, 5-EtO-DPT, 5-EtO-DiPT, 5-EtO-DALT, 5-EtO-MPT, 5-EtO-MiPT, 5-EtO-EiPT, 5-EtO-MET and 5-EtO-EPT have been synthesized as analytical standards in order to facilitate future research into these compounds.

See also 
 5-Benzyloxytryptamine
 5-EtO-AMT
 5-Ethyl-DMT
 5-(Nonyloxy)tryptamine
 O-Acetylbufotenine

References 

Tryptamines
Dimethylamino compounds